Jaime Jaramillo Arango (January 17, 1897 – July 30, 1962) was a Colombian professor of medicine and surgery, author, diplomat, and politician. He was dean of medicine of the National University of Colombia and Director of the same institution, pioneer of modern medicine, Minister Plenipotentiary in the Colombian foreign policy during the Second World War, Minister of education, and founder of the Anglo Colombian School.

Professor Jaramillo Arango wrote several books of medicine and botany. The most important was “The British Contribution to Medicine” that studied the investigations and discoveries of several Nobel laureates: penicillin,  by Alexander Fleming; malaria, by Ronald Ross; paludrine, by F. H. Curd, D. G. Davey, and F. L. Rose; vitamins, by Gowland Hopkins; and stilboestrol, by Robert Robinson and Charles Dodds. The foreword of Jaramillo's book was written by Arthur Mac Nalty, British Chief Medical Officer of the British government.

Jaramillo Arango became the Permanent Delegate of Colombia to the League of Nations, and Permanent Delegate of Colombia to the First Assembly of the UNESCO in London, in November 1945, where he proposed the creation of the United Nations University. In 1973 the United Nations University, UNU, started to work as the academic research arm of the United Nations, with diplomatic status as a United Nation Institution.  Ist missión was since the beginning  to help human development and welfare through education.

Family
Jaime Jaramillo Arango was born on January 17, 1897, in Manizales, Colombia. He was the son of Francisco Jaramillo Jaramillo and Dolores Arango Isaza. The family descended from Alonso Jaramillo de Andrade, from Extremadura, Spain.

Education
Jaramillo Arango studied first in the St. Thomas Aquinas School in Manizales, and in the St. Bartholomew Major College in Bogotá. He studied medicine in the National University of Colombia, and surgery in Paris, London, and Rochester, United States.

Career

Pioneer of modern medicine
He returned to Colombia, and became the Director of surgery of the Hospital San Juan de Dios from 1920 to 1923, and from 1927 to 1931. He was the president and member of the board of directors of the institution in several occasions.

Due to his extensive studies and professional experience, he became a pioneer of the Colombian modern medicine, and the most eminent Colombian surgeon of his time. He was the primary doctor of three presidents of Colombia and many personalities.

Professor, Rector and Minister
In the 1930s, he began his career in education: from 1933 to 1934, he was a professor and  dean of medicine of the National University of Colombia; and, in 1934, president Enrique Olaya Herrera appointed him as Minister of National Education. Rector of the National University of Colombia from 1949 to 1950.

Diplomatic figure
In 1938, the liberal president Alfonso López Pumarejo appointed Jaime Jaramillo Arango as Minister Plenipotentiary of Colombia to Germany. That year, he was assigned also as Minister Plenipotentiary, during World War Two, to the United Kingdom, from 1940 to 1945, and Minister Plenipotenciary to the governments in exile: Norway, Denmark, Belgium, Netherlands, and Poland, based in London.

Witness of the horrors of Kristallnacht
On August 2, 1938, Jaramillo Arango arrived in Berlin. The chosen date to present credentials as ambassador to Adolf Hitler was November 15. But, on November 9, the Nazi paramilitary squadrons began brutally attacking the Jewish population and their stores, known as Kristallnacht: the initiation of the persecution of Jews by the Third Reich. The following day, November 10, Ambassador Jaramillo, and his two assistants were arrested because they had been taking pictures of the impressive damage in Kurfürstendamm, from the diplomatic automobile. They were taken to the Ministry of Foreign Affairs, where they were released two hours later. Due to these events, Hitler cancelled the appointment with the Colombian delegation.

Following Kristallnacht, on November 24, 1938, Jaramillo Arango left Germany and exiled himself, first in France, and then in England, where he was assigned as Minister Plenipotenciary to the United Kingdom until 1945. The Colombian embassy in Berlin was vacant until 1953.

The official report of Ambassador Jaramillo appeared later in special articles and books about Kristallnacht; and the pictures taken that described the horror of the events on November 9, 1938, were exposed 75 years later in a commemorative exhibition in the New Synagogue of Berlin, in 2013.

Ambassador to the United Kingdom 
In 1939, he headed the Colombian delegation to the League of Nations in Geneva, Switzerland, the actual United Nations. Amid the expansion of the Third Reich across Europe, president Eduardo Santos named him as Minister Plenipotentiary to Great Britain, from September 1940 to 1943. Jaime Jaramillo Arango suffered, too, the Blitz of the German bombing to London during World War II. He was appointed also as Minister Plenipotentiary to the Governments in Exile, Poland, Belgium, Denmark, the Netherlands, and Norway, based in the British capital. He became the first Colombian ambassador to the United Kingdom, from 1940 to December 19, 1945.

University of the United Nations
In November 1945, Jaramillo Arango was the Colombian delegate to the First Assembly of UNESCO in London, and was elected as vice president. He proposed the creation of the University of the United Nations.

In his speech, Ambassador Jaramillo Arango remembered the physical and spiritual famine in Europe, the teachers killed, and the buildings, universities and monuments destroyed during the war. He called for a rapid reconstruction and rehabilitation of Europe through a system of  education and international  cooperation. During the UNESCO First Assembly in 1945, his proposition was received with applause, and In 1973   the United Nations University started to work.,ed

National University of Colombia
After an intense diplomatic life, Jaramillo Arango returned to his country. From 1949 to 1950, he became the Rector of the National University of Colombia

Foundation of the Anglo Colombian School

In February 1956, due to his deep admiration for the British scientists and educators that had been his teachers and colleagues, professor Jaramillo Arango founded the Anglo Colombian School of Bogotá, an international,  bilingüal, mixt-sex education, and intellectually plural school, inspired by the British educational system. To this day, it is one of the most prestigious schools of Colombia.

Personal life
In 1932 Jaime Jaramillo Arango married Carolina Cárdenas Núñez. In 1936 she died of meningitis. 

He had a daughter, given the name Marta Maria Lombard who was raised in London.

In 1948, he married María José Nemry von Thenen, a Belgian citizen.

He died on July 30, 1962.

Selected works

Professor Jaramillo Arango wrote several books and articles about science, medicine and botany, in Spanish and English:

1948 – A propósito de algunas piezas inéditas de orfebrería Chibcha (About Some Unpublished Pieces of Chibcha Goldsmithing) Bogotá: Imprenta del Banco de la República.
1949 – A Critical Review of the Basic Facts in the History of Cinchona, published on dec. 23, 2008 in Botanical Journal of The Linnean Society., vol 53.)
1950 – The Conquest of Malaria London: William Heinemann Medical Books Ltd. 
1952 – The Journals of Hipólito Ruiz, a Spanish botanist in Peru and Chile, 1777–1788. Transcribed to Spanish from the original manuscripts by Jaime Jaramillo Arango, and translated to English by Richard Evans Schultes and María José von Thenen Cambridge: Cambridge University Press, 1952 / 1998.
1953 - The British Contribution to Medicine. Foreword by Sir Arthur Mac Nalty London: E. & S. Livingstone Ltd.
1953 – Don José Celestino Mutis y las expediciones botánicas españolas del siglo XVIII al Nuevo Mundo (Don José Celestino Mutis and the Spanish Botanists Expeditions from the 18th Century to the New World) Separata de la Revista Bolívar, No. 9, 1952 / Separata de la Revista de la Academia Colombiana de Ciencias, Vol. VIII, Nos. 33 y 34, mayo de 1953.
1959 – Historia de los antibióticos. Bogotá: Editorial Pax.
1962 – Manual del árbol. Bogotá: Editorial Voluntad Ltda.

References 

Colombian surgeons
Malariologists
National University of Colombia alumni
Academic staff of the National University of Colombia
Rectors of universities and colleges in Colombia
Colombian Ministers of National Education
Members of the Senate of Colombia
Ambassadors of Colombia to the United Kingdom
Ambassadors of Colombia to Germany
Permanent Representatives of Colombia to the United Nations
Permanent Delegates of Colombia to UNESCO
Ambassadors of Colombia to Denmark
Ambassadors of Colombia to Belgium
Ambassadors of Colombia to the Netherlands
Ambassadors of Colombia to Norway
Ambassadors of Colombia to Poland
Colombian botanical writers
20th-century surgeons
Colombian writers
Colombian male writers